Patric Chiha (born 3 March 1975) is an Austrian film director, screenwriter and film editor of Hungarian and Lebanese origin. After directing several short films and documentaries, his first feature film, Domain (2009), premiered at the 2009 Venice Film Festival. In 2014, he directed his second feature film, Boys Like Us. His documentaries Brothers of the Night (2016), and If It Were Love (2020) were both selected for the Berlin Film Festival. His third feature film, The Beast in the Jungle, will be released in 2023.

Early life
Chiha was born in Vienna, Austria on 3 March 1975. He is of Hungarian and Lebanese origin, and has lived in France since the age of 18. 

Chiha studied fashion design at ESAA Duperré in Paris and film editing at INSAS in Brussels.

Career
After directing several short films and documentaries, his first feature film, Domain (2009), premiered at the 2009 Venice Film Festival. In 2014, he directed his second feature film, Boys Like Us. His documentaries Brothers of the Night (2016), and If It Were Love (2020) were both selected for the Berlin Film Festival. 

His third feature film, The Beast in the Jungle, will premiere at the 2023 Berlin Film Festival.

Filmography

Awards and nominations 
Athens International Film Festival

Austrian Film Award

Berlin Film Festival

Lumières Awards

Venice Film Festival

References

External links 
 
 Patric Chiha on UniFrance
 Patric Chiha on AlloCiné
 Patric Chiha on Cineuropa

1975 births
Living people
Austrian film directors
People from Vienna
Austrian male screenwriters
Austrian screenwriters
Austrian film editors
French-language film directors
Austrian expatriates in France
Austrian people of Hungarian descent
Austrian people of Lebanese descent
Film directors from Vienna